Marco Calliari is a singer-songwriter born in Quebec from Italian parents. He began his career in 1989 in forming the thrash metal group Anonymus alongside Carlos Araya and brothers Daniel and Oscar Souto. Since 2003, he pursued a solo career that has so far released three albums: Che la vita, Mia dolce vita, and Al faro est.

With his first album, Che la vita, Calliari found a way to reconnect with his parents' country of origin. The album, based on Italian folklore and jazz influences, won Calliari the Galaxy award in the summer of 2004, given by the CBC at a music festival in Abitibi-Témiscamingue and was nominated at the Gala MIMI in 2005. An active member of the Italian community in Montreal, he has also participated in first two editions of Ritalfest, a festival honoring Italian music in Quebec.

Discography

Albums
 Che la vita, 2003
Bella luna
Angelo
Che la vita... (camminar)
Il scelto
Lacrime
Queste parole
Amore
Tierra
Solo
Matta ma sana
Paura
Ô
Torna a Surriento
Lontana

 Mia dolce vita, 2006
L'americano
L'italiano
Leggenda di natale
Chi è, e non è
'O sole mio
Recitar! (Vesti la giubba)
Caruso
I due fannulloni
Chitarra romana
Bella ciao
La montanara
Cosa nostra (The Godfather Medley)
Mattinata

 Al dente, DVD double, 2006
 Al faro est, 2010
Sierras, cielo y almas
Per fortuna
Bino di Bedonia
Andare, camminare, lavorare
Ho un amico
Flamenka
Ladro di pensieri
Freddo
Il valzer dell'amore infinito
Come se fosse
La Rabbia
Tango Porco
Al faro est

Singles

Other interests 
 Le Monde de Belle et Bum, 2004 : "Che la vita"
 Les Rythmes de Belle et Bum, 2005 : "Quand le soleil dit bonjour aux montagnes" (avec Lynda Thalie)
 Serge Fiori : Un musicien parmi tant d'autres, 2006 : "Che la vita" (Dixie)
 Cooking 3, 2006 : "Bella luna"
 Le Noël Angélique de Sœur Angèle, 2006 : "Tu scendi dalle stelle"

References

External links 
 Site officiel
 Vidéos

Year of birth missing (living people)
Living people
Italian emigrants to Canada
Singers from Montreal
Canadian male singers
Canadian heavy metal singers